Michael Sionidis ( or , ; 1870–1935) was a Greek leader of makedonomachoi in the Macedonian Struggle.

Early life
Michael Sionidis was born in the village of Grčište, Ottoman Empire (near Bogdanci in the present-day North Macedonia) in 1870.

Military career
At the outbreak of the Macedonian Struggle in 1904, Sionidis fought against the pro-Bulgarian komitadjis, acting in an area covering Grčište, Gevgelija and Doirani. Sionidis first fought under Georgios Zira, then under , before he finally founded his own militia.

In the autumn of 1904, Bulgarian komitadjis killed several of Grčište's Greek inhabitants, including the teacher Catherine Hadjigeorgiou, who was Michael's cousin, the teacher Constantine Sionidis, Andronikis' daughter, and five other Greeks. In retaliation, Sionidis led his militia in an attack on the village of Marvinci, where the komitadjis were hiding. After getting injured, he went to Gevgelija to recuperate (January 1905).

After the First Balkan War, Grčište came under Serbian control, and Sionidis moved to the village of Matsikovo (modern Evzonoi), which was at the time on the Greco-Serbian border. During the Balkan Wars, King Constantine I of Greece established his headquarters in his house. Sionidis participated in the Battle of Kilkis-Lahanas, where he was injured. Sionidis also participated in the Battle of Skra-di-Legen during World War I, and worked as a secret agent of the Third Army Corps behind enemy lines, in the area of Strumica.

Later years
Following the end of World War I, Sionidis, as president of Matsikovo community, retrieved the remains of nine evzones whom the Bulgarians had killed during the Second Balkan War, and buried them in his village. In 1927, the  renamed Matsikovo to Evzonoi in their honour. Michael Sionidis died in 1935.

For his services, he was awarded the Golden Cross of Valour, Greece's highest bravery award, along with the War Cross and the Commemorative Medal of the Macedonian Struggle.

Notes

References

Further reading

1870 births
1935 deaths
People from Valandovo Municipality
Eastern Orthodox Christians from Greece
Macedonian revolutionaries (Greek)
People of the Macedonian Struggle
Macedonia under the Ottoman Empire
Greek people of the Balkan Wars
Greek people of World War I
Recipients of the War Cross (Greece)
Recipients of the Cross of Valour (Greece)
Greeks from the Ottoman Empire
Greek Macedonians